Calcinidae is a family of aquatic hermit crab of the superfamily Paguroidea.

The following genera are currently accepted within Calcinidae:
 Allodardanus Haig & Provenzano, 1965
 Aniculus Dana, 1852
 Bathynarius Forest, 1989
 Calcinus Dana, 1851
 Ciliopagurus Forest, 1995
 Dardanus Paulson, 1875
 Trizopagurus Forest, 1952

References 

Hermit crabs
Crustaceans described in 2017
Decapod families